Jess Cartner-Morley is a British journalist. She has been the fashion editor of The Guardian since 2000.

After attending the private City of London School for Girls, and studying History at Oxford University, Cartner-Morley had work experience at Just Seventeen magazine before joining The Guardian as a researcher. She was deputy fashion editor before becoming The Guardian's fashion editor in June 2000.

She is married to Tom Findlay from the electronic music duo Groove Armada. They have two children and live in North London.

References

External links
UKmediawatch
Telegraph Article
Guardian profile
Jess Cartner-Morley on Twitter
How to Dress series on theguardian.com

Living people
British journalists
Fashion editors
The Guardian journalists
Year of birth missing (living people)
Place of birth missing (living people)
People educated at the City of London School for Girls